West of Santa Fe is a 1928 American silent Western film directed by J.P. McGowan and starring Bob Custer, Peggy Montgomery and Bud Osborne.

Cast
 Bob Custer as Jack 
 Peggy Montgomery as Helen 
 Bud Osborne as Crooked Foreman 
 J.P. McGowan as Rancher 
 Mack V. Wright as Henchman 
 Ralph Bucko as Henchman 
 Roy Bucko as Henchman
 Cliff Lyons as Cowhand

References

Bibliography
 John J. McGowan. J.P. McGowan: Biography of a Hollywood Pioneer. McFarland, 2005.

External links
 

1928 films
1928 Western (genre) films
Films directed by J. P. McGowan
American black-and-white films
Silent American Western (genre) films
1920s English-language films
1920s American films